Cannons appeared in Korea by the mid 14th century during the Goryeo dynasty and quickly proliferated as naval and fortress-defense weapons. Major developments occurred throughout the 15th century, including the introduction of large siege mortars as well as major improvements that drastically increased range, power, and accuracy.

The Imjin War in the 1590s marked the beginning of a Korean military revolution which saw improvements in cannon design and the introduction and adaptation of foreign-based firearms. This included the en masse adoption of muskets and the adoption of volley fire and rigorous drill techniques. Breech-loading swivel guns were particularly popular as light anti-personnel artillery.

With the rising threat of European powers in the 19th century, the Joseon dynasty made attempts at reverse-engineering European firearms but eventually had to simply buy them from foreign entities.

Early history
The earliest possible references to firearms in Korea is to what might have been gunpowder-ignited flamethrowers in 1104 and explosive bombs in 1135. The next reference is to a cannon which fired large arrows being tested for use on the northwestern frontier in 1356.

In 1373 King Gongmin visited a new fleet which was being constructed for use against the Wokou, including the firing of cannon. He then requested a shipment of cannon, gunpowder, and gunpowder ingredients from Ming, which was granted the following year.

However, these weapons were not produced locally and had to be secured from elsewhere.

Choe Mu-seon, a minor military official, managed to learn the methods of potassium nitrate purification from a visiting Chinese saltpeter merchant. After petitioning the court for several years, the Firearms Directorate was established in 1377 to oversee firearms production and development.

A fleet of ships was trained in cannon use in 1378 and in 1380 saw its first use defeating a Wokou pirate near the mouth of the Geum River. Three years later in 1383 the Korean navy again defeated the Wokou with cannon.

By 1395 a number of weapons were in use: a series of cannons called the daejanggunpo, ijanggunpo, and samjanggunpo, a shell-firing mortar called the jillyeopo, series of yuhwa, juhwa, and chokcheonhwa rockets, which were the forerunners of the singijeon, and a signal gun called the shinpo.

In 1410, Korea had 160 ships equipped with gunpowder artillery.

Joseon era cannons

Early Joseon (early to mid 15th century)
During Taejong's rule, improvements were made. Among the people responsible for the developments was Choe Hae-san, the son of the aforementioned Choe Mu-seon. The cheon "heaven" or "sky", ji "earth", hyeon "black", and hwang "yellow" or "gold" names are not significant, being the first four characters of the Thousand Character Classic, thus making them equivalent to Cannons A, B, C, and D. The following is a list some of the main cannons (called hwapo "fire gourd") of this time period:
 The cheonja-hwapo "heaven" or "sky" (천자화포/天字火砲), with a maximum range of about 500–620 m (400-500 bo).
 The jija-hwapo "earth" (지자화포/地字火砲), with a maximum range of about 620 m (500 bo) with an arrow or dart.
 The hyeonja-hwapo "black" (현자화포/玄字火砲), with a maximum range of about 620 m (500 bo) with an arrow or dart.
 The hwangja-hwapo "yellow" or "gold" (황자화포/黃字火砲), with a maximum range of about 620 m (500 bo).
 The gaja-hwapo (가자화포/架子火砲), with a maximum range of about 250–370 m (200-300 bo).
 The se-hwapo "slender" or "small" (세화포/細火砲), with a maximum range of about 250 m (200 bo). This was a very small hand-cannon which functioned as a pistol or a cavalry weapon.

Written records for cannons of this era come from the Veritable Records of the Joseon Dynasty .

Early Mid Joseon (mid 15th century to mid 16th century)
Sejong made many improvements, and increased the ranges of these cannons (called hwapo and later hwatong "fire tube" and chongtong "gun tube"):
 The cheonja-hwapo (천자화포/天字火砲), with a maximum range of about 1610 m (1300 bo) with an arrow or dart, and about 1240 m (1000 bo) with four arrows or darts, with less powder. This later came to be called the janggun-hwatong "general fire tube" (장군화통).
 The jija-hwapo (지자화포/地字火砲), with a maximum range of about 990–1120 m (800-900 bo) with an arrow or dart, and about 740–870 m (600-700 bo) with four arrows or darts, with equal powder. Later called the il-chongtong "first chongtong" (일총통).
 The hyeonja-hwapo (현자화포/玄字火砲) is not mentioned among the improved cannons. This was later called the i-chongtong "second chongtong" (이총통).
 The hwangja-hwapo (황자화포/黃字火砲), with a maximum range of about 990 m (800 bo) with an arrow or dart, and about 620 m (500 bo) with four arrows or darts with equal powder. This was later called the sam-chongtong "third chongtong" (삼총통).
 The gaja-hwapo (가자화포/架子火砲), with a maximum range of about 740 m (600 bo) with an arrow or dart, and about 500 m (400 bo) with four arrows or darts with equal powder.
 The se-hwapo (세화포/細火砲), with a maximum range of about 740 m (600 bo) with an arrow or dart with equal powder. This gun was about 13.8 cm long and had a bore of about 9 mm. It was later called the se-chongtong (세총통/細銃筒).

In the early 1500s, the bullanggi (불랑기/佛狼機), a breech-loading swivel gun, was introduced to Korea from Portugal via China. It was divided into sizes 1 through 5, in decreasing size. There was also a mortar of this period called the chongtong-wan'gu.

Written records of these cannons come from the Veritable Records of the Joseon Dynasty  and the Gukjo Orye Seorye, published in 1474.

Mid Joseon (mid 16th century to late 16th century)

The small-but-powerful cannons of this era saw extensive use during the Japanese invasions of Korea (1592–98), by both the Joseon Army and the Navy. They were very effective against the weaker-built Japanese ships. The Nanjung ilgi says that many were captured and used by the Japanese when their full potential was realized.

The following is a list of some of the large cannons (called chongtong) used by the Joseon military:
The cheonja-chongtong (천자총통/天字銃筒) was the largest. One actual specimen made in 1555 (National Treasure of Korea #647) is about 1.31 m long with a bore of 12.8 cm, and weighs about 296 kg. The Korea Naval Academy tested the effective range of a replica, and it was found to be 400–500 m with a dart and 350–400 m with iron grapeshot. These were mostly used on panokseon battleships.
The jija-chongtong (지자총통/地字銃筒) was the second largest. Two actual specimens made in 1557 (National Treasure of Korea #862 and #863) are about 89.5 cm with bore of 10.5 cm and 89 cm with a bore of 10.5 cm. The replica tested by the academy had effective ranges of 500–600 m with a dart, and 500–540 m with grapeshot. These were mostly used on turtle ships.
The hyeonja-chongtong (현자총통/玄字銃筒) was the third largest. An actual specimen made in 1555 (National Treasure of Korea #1233) has a length of about 75.8 cm and a bore of about 6.5 cm. The Naval Academy tested a replica that had an effective range of 400–600 m with a dart, and 1100–1250 m with iron grapeshot.
The hwangja-chongtong (황자총통/黃字銃筒) was the smallest. One specimen made in 1587 (National Treasure of Korea #886) has a length of 50.4 cm. The replica tested by the Naval Academy had an effective range of 400–450 m with a dart, and 1380–1590 m with iron grapeshot.

The hand-cannons were as follows:
The seungja-chongtong, or "victory" (승자총통/勝字銃筒) was a hand-cannon. A specimen made in 1579 (National Treasure of Korea #648) is 56.8 cm long. Its maximum range with a dart (according to the Hwaposhik Eonhae, 1635) was about 740 m (600 bo). The Naval Academy's test showed a range with iron grapeshot of 200–300 m.

Mortars used at this time were the byeoldae-wan'gu, dae-wan'gu, jung-wan'gu, and so-wan'gu. These fired stones or timed explosive shells.

Late Mid Joseon (late 16th century to late 17th century)
Improvements were made on the earlier designs.
The following is a list of some of the cannons:
 cheonja-chongtong (천자총통/天字銃筒)
 jija-chongtong (지자총통/地字銃筒)
 hyeonja-chongtong (현자총통/玄字銃筒)
 hwangja-chongtong (황자총통/黃字銃筒)
 byeorhwangja-chongtong (별황자총통)

Mortars used during this period:
 Byeoldae-wan'gu (별대완구)
 Dae-wan'gu (대완구/大碗口)
 Jung-wan'gu (중완구/中碗口)

Written records for this period are the Shin'gi Bigyeol (신기비결) in 1603, Hwagi Dogam Uigye (화기도감의궤) in 1615, and Hwaposhik Eonhae (화포식언해) in 1635.

Late Joseon (late 17th century to late 19th century)
The Hong'ipo was a cannon introduced from the Netherlands by Hendrick Hamel and others in the 1650s. It was used during the 1866 French campaign against Korea, the 1871 United States expedition to Korea and the Ganghwa Island incident of September 20, 1875.
Jungpo was a bronze muzzle-loading cannon made in 1874 with a caliber of 120 mm.
Sopo was a bronze muzzle-loading cannon made in 1874 with a caliber of 84 mm.

Written records from this time period come from the Yungwon Pilbi (융원필비) in 1813 and the Hun'guk Shinjo Gun'gi Doseol (훈국신조군기도설) in 1867.

Operation and projectiles

A unique method of loading the Koreans (and the Chinese, to some extent) was that they used a block of wood (gyeongmok) and some paper as a wad. This increased range, power, and possibly accuracy. Sand was also poured in with cheorhwan (iron shot).

Cannonballs of stone (danseok) or iron (cheoltanja), iron shot (sometimes in conjunction with arrows), and timed shells (bigyeokjincheolloe) were used, but a large wooden dart with iron fins (leather for the smaller types) and head was preferred. These were more accurate. Test firings in Seoul noted that the darts buried themselves into the ground up to their iron fletching. When the Korea Naval Academy tested one shot out of a cheonja-chongtong, it flew 400 m and smashed 50 cm into a granite brick wall. The Secretary of Defense commented that it would be effective in attacking fortresses.

Mortars usually fired stone balls or timed shells.

See also
 Artillery of Japan

Citations

References 
 Kim, Jung Jin. The Turtle Ship: From Legend to History. Joongang, Seoul: Random House Publishing. pp. 48–51.

External links
 YouTube video of a se-chongtong
 YouTube video of making and firing a sajeon-chongtong
 YouTube video of firing several muzzle-loaders, a repeating crossbow, and a seungja-chongtong

Cannon
Early firearms
Firearms of Korea
Korean inventions
Rockets and missiles
Weapons of Korea